The Bishop of Wakefield was the ordinary of the now-defunct Church of England Diocese of Wakefield in the Province of York. The diocese was based in Wakefield in West Yorkshire, covering the City of Wakefield, Barnsley, Kirklees and Calderdale.  The see was centred in the City of Wakefield where the bishop's seat (cathedra) was located in the Cathedral Church of All Saints, a parish church elevated to cathedral status in 1888.

The diocesan bishop's residence was Bishop's Lodge, Wakefield. The office existed from the founding of the diocese in 1888 under Queen Victoria until its dissolution on 20 April 2014. The cathedral contains a memorial to Walsham How, first Bishop of Wakefield. The last diocesan Bishop of Wakefield was Stephen Platten, the 12th Bishop of Wakefield, who signed +Stephen Wakefield and was in post when his diocese was dissolved.

Upon the creation of the Diocese of Leeds on 20 April 2014, the see was dissolved and its territory added to the new diocese, within which the suffragan see of Pontefract has since been translated to the area Bishop of Wakefield.

Assistant bishops
Among those who have served as assistant bishops in the diocese were:
1924: Rupert Mounsey CR, former Bishop of Labuan and Sarawak (1909–1916)
19671975 (d.): Victor Shearburn CR, former Bishop of Rangoon
1981–1985: Patrick Harris, Rector of Kirkheaton, former Bishop of Northern Argentina (later Bishop of Southwell)

References

Sources

External links
 Crockford's Clerical Directory - Listings

Wakefield diocese
 
Bishops of Wakefield diocese